Sainagar Shirdi – Pandharpur Express is an intercity train of the Indian Railways connecting Sainagar Shirdi in Maharashtra and Pandharpur of in Maharashtra. It is currently being operated with 11001/11002 train numbers on thrice a week basis.

Service

The 11001/Sainagar Shirdi – Pandharpur Express has an average speed of 48 km/hr and covers 349 km in 7 hrs 15 mins. 11002/Pandharpur – Sainagar Shirdi Express  has an average speed of 47 km/hr and 349 km in 7 hrs 30 mins.

Route and halts 

 
 
 Belapur

Traction

Both trains are hauled by either a Pune Loco Shed based WDM 3A or Kalyan Loco Shed based WDM 3A diesel locomotive from Shirdi to Pandharpur.

Direction Reversal

Train Reverses its direction 2 times:

See also 

 Karnataka Express
 Mumbai CST - Pandharpur Fast Passenger
 Sainagar Shirdi-Chhatrapati Shivaji Terminus Fast Passenger

Notes

External links 
 11001 Sainagar Shirdi Pandharpur Express
 11002 Pandharpur Sainagar Shirdi Express
 11001/Sainagar Shirdi – Pandharpur Express
 11002/Pandharpur – Sainagar Shirdi Express

References 

Transport in Shirdi
Express trains in India
Rail transport in Maharashtra
Railway services introduced in 2011